San Diego College may refer to the following in San Diego, California:

Community colleges
San Diego City College, public, two-year community college location in Downtown San Diego
San Diego Mesa College, public, two year community college located in the community of Clairemont Mesa
San Diego Miramar College,  public, two-year community college in the Miramar neighborhood

Four-year colleges
San Diego Christian College, private, evangelical Christian college in Santee
California College San Diego, private college affiliated with the Center for Excellence in Higher Education

See also
University of San Diego, private Roman Catholic research university
San Diego State University, public research university in the California State University system
University of California, San Diego, public research university in the UC school system
Education in San Diego